The Kings of the Beats 2 is an album by Luny Tunes showcasing many of their greatest beats to date.
Most of the beats were based on songs that appeared on their albums Mas Flow: Los Benjamins, Mas Flow 2, and Mas Flow 2.5.

Track listing
"Fantasma" (3:53)       
"Hello" (3:28)       
"Beautiful" (3:01)       
"Noche de Entierro" (4:07)       
"Mi Fanática" (4:00)       
"Alócate" (3:06)       
"Mayor Que Yo, Pt. 1" (4:42)       
"Mayor Que Yo, Pt. 2" (3:57)       
"Rakata" (2:52)       
"Te He Querido, Te He Llorado" (4:15)       
"Yo Quiero" (2:44)       
"Ponla Ahi" (3:50)       
"Mírame" (3:53)       
"Slow Motion" (3:19)       
"Royal Rumble" (6:17)       
"Piden Reggaeton" (3:10)       
"Hay de Sobra" (2:53)       
"Entrégate" (3:46)       
"De Ti Me Enamoré" (3:23)       
"Clak Clak" (3:25)

 

Luny Tunes albums
2006 compilation albums
Instrumental albums
Albums produced by Luny Tunes